Vladimír Lučan (born 4 June 1977, Zlín) is a Czech orienteering competitor. He received a silver medal in relay at the 2000 European Orienteering Championships in Truskavets, together with Michal Jedlička and Rudolf Ropek. He has a silver medal from the 1997 Junior World Orienteering Championships in Leopoldsburg.

See also
 Czech orienteers
 List of orienteers
 List of orienteering events

References

External links
 

1977 births
Living people
Sportspeople from Zlín
Czech orienteers
Male orienteers
Foot orienteers
Competitors at the 2001 World Games
Junior World Orienteering Championships medalists